Mooresville is a town in Brown Township, Morgan County, in the U.S. state of Indiana. As of the 2010 census, the town population was 9,326.

History
Mooresville was founded in 1824 by Samuel Moore, and named for him. A post office has been in operation at Mooresville since 1826.

The Mooresville Commercial Historic District, Mooresville Friends Academy Building, and Mooresville Gymnasium are listed on the National Register of Historic Places.

The Mooresville Chamber of Commerce has been credited for bringing the town through many changes and updates to modernize public spaces for the modern era. This is largely due in part to the Chamber of Commerce Executive Director, Melinda "Mindy" Taylor, who, aside from being credited as the originator of the phrase "cool beans" (a slang term for positive response), has been a constant agent of change for the betterment of the community.

On April 8, 2020, an EF1 tornado hit downtown, with significant winds around 100mph.

Geography

Demographics

2010 census
As of the census of 2010, there were 9,326 people, 3,715 households, and 2,558 families living in the town. The racial makeup of the town was 97.5% White, 0.3% African American, 0.2% Native American, 0.5% Asian, 0.3% from other races, and 1.2% from two or more races. Hispanic or Latino of any race were 1.1% of the population.

There were 3,715 households, of which 36.1% had children under the age of 18 living with them, 49.0% were married couples living together, 14.2% had a female householder with no male present, 5.6% had a male householder with no female present, and 31.1% were non-families. 26.5% of all households were made up of individuals, and 11.6% had someone living alone who was 65 years of age or older. The average household size was 2.49 and the average family size was 2.99.

The median age in the town was 38.6 years. 25.4% of residents were under the age of 18; 8.3% were between the ages of 18 and 24; 26.4% were from 25 to 44; 25.6% were from 45 to 64; and 14.3% were 65 years of age or older. The gender makeup of the town was 47.1% male and 52.9% female.

2000 census
As of the census of 2000, there were 9,273 people, 3,535 households, and 2,594 families living in the town. The racial makeup of the town was 98.52% White, 0.09% African American, 0.30% Native American, 0.40% Asian, 0.02% Pacific Islander, 0.18% from other races, and 0.49% from two or more races. Hispanic or Latino of any race were 0.72% of the population.

There were 3,535 households, out of which 39.1% had children under the age of 18 living with them, 57.5% were married couples living together, 12.4% had a female householder with no male present, and 26.6% were non-families. 22.8% of all households were made up of individuals, and 8.9% had someone living alone who was 65 years of age or older. The average household size was 2.59 and the average family size was 3.05.

In the town, the population was spread out, with 28.5% under the age of 18, 8.5% from 18 to 24, 32.7% from 25 to 44, 19.3% from 45 to 64, and 11.0% who were 65 years of age or older. The median age was 33 years. For every 100 females, there were 90.7 males. For every 100 females age 18 and over, there were 87.5 males.

The median income for a household in the town was $47,292, and the median income for a family was $52,543. Males had a median income of $37,763 versus $26,520 for females. The per capita income for the town was $21,504. About 4.2% of families and 4.3% of the population were below the poverty line, including 6.6% of those under age 18 and 3.3% of those age 65 or over.

Education

Mooresville schools are part of the Mooresville Consolidated School Corporation.

Elementary schools
 Northwood Elementary
 Newby Memorial Elementary
 Neil A. Armstrong Elementary
 North Madison Elementary
 Waverly Elementary.

Middle school
 Paul Hadley Middle School, named after the designer of the Indiana State Flag.

High school
 Mooresville High School.

Private school
 Mooresville Christian Academy, founded in 1975.

Mooresville Friends Academy
The Mooresville school system began with the Friends Academy, which was built in 1861. The Academy Building, one of the first high schools in the state of Indiana, was a boarding school with students renting rooms from area residents. The school building sits on the Newby Memorial Elementary School campus, has been restored, and is listed on the National Register of Historic Places. The building now serves as a local history museum as well as the offices of the Community Foundation of Morgan County, Inc. Also on the Newby campus is the "old Newby gym" or the "Newby Dome." The gym was built in the early 1900s with help from Mooresville residents who each contributed $100 to help build the facility. The campus also includes the Mooresville Veterans Memorial, which honors Mooresville's fallen soldiers from World War I and beyond. The Memorial also honors Sammy Lee Davis, who received the Medal of Honor for heroism in Vietnam. Davis is known as "The Real Forrest Gump" since his Vietnam story is mirrored in the movie Forrest Gump and his Medal of Honor ceremony footage is used in the movie.

Public library
The town has a lending library, the Mooresville Public Library.

Infrastructure

Transportation
Mooresville is served by Indiana State Road 67. Indiana State Road 42 & Indiana State Road 144 End at SR 67 in Southern Mooresville.

Due to the recent redesign of the Indianapolis International Airport, Mooresville is actually closer to the airport's new passenger terminal (11.5 miles by road, according to Google Maps) than downtown Indianapolis is (14.8 miles).

Health care
Mooresville is served by Franciscan St. Francis Health-Mooresville, formerly known as Kendrick Hospital and St. Francis Hospital-Mooresville.  The full-service hospital includes an emergency department, labor and delivery and cancer care, and it is home to the Joint Replacement Surgeons of Indiana Research Foundation.

Notable people
 William G. Bray, Republican, elected to the U.S. House of Representatives in 1950 and served from the 82nd to 93rd Congress
 John Dillinger, gangster and bank robber
 Paul Hadley, designer of the Indiana State Flag
 Julia D. Nelson, elected to the Indiana House of Representatives in 1921, the first woman elected to the Indiana General Assembly
 Amos Rusie, member of the Baseball Hall of Fame
 Ruth Hinshaw Spray, peace activist
 Nan Whaley, mayor of Dayton, Ohio

Neighboring communities

References

External links
 Town website

Towns in Indiana
Towns in Morgan County, Indiana
Indianapolis metropolitan area